Pristava is a small settlement above the village of Mahniči in the Municipality of Sežana in the Littoral region of Slovenia.

References

External links
Pristava on Geopedia

Populated places in the Municipality of Sežana